Lone Tree Township is a township in Clay County, Iowa, USA.  As of the 2000 census, its population was 860.

History
Lone Tree Township was created in 1877. Lone Tree Township takes its name from a large elm tree that was a local landmark on the prairie.

Geography
According to the USGS, it contains one cemetery, Lone Tree.

The stream of Sewer Creek runs through this township.

Notes

References
 USGS Geographic Names Information System (GNIS)

External links
 US-Counties.com
 City-Data.com

Townships in Clay County, Iowa
Townships in Iowa